Jakob Anderson (born September 16, 1980) is an American fishing captain and co-owner of the fishing vessel FV Saga. Since 2007, Anderson has been featured in the Discovery Channel documentary television series Deadliest Catch.

Career
Anderson was hired as a greenhorn by Captain Sig Hansen aboard the Northwestern in 2007. Anderson made his Deadliest Catch debut in the episode New Beginnings, which aired on May 15. Anderson has endured personal tragedies on Deadliest Catch, including being notified that his sister, Chelsea Dawn Anderson, had unexpectedly died during the season five episode fourteen "Bitter Tears", and later learning that his father, Keith Anderson, went missing and presumed dead after his truck was found abandoned in rural Washington during season six, episode eleven "Blown Off Course". In 2012, the skeletal remains of Anderson's father were found by a hiker about a mile away from where his truck was abandoned. In 2012, Anderson was promoted to deck boss of the Northwestern, and later that year he obtained his USCG Mate 1600-ton license and Master 100-ton Captain's license. Since 2015, Anderson is captain of the crab fishing vessel Saga.

Personal life
Anderson and his wife, Jenna, live in Seattle, Washington, with their three children. Anderson is an avid skateboarder and is sponsored by the American footwear and clothing company DVS Shoes. He has a signature skateboard shoe released through the company.

During an interview with Dr. Drew Pinsky, Anderson revealed that he is a recovering alcoholic and his addiction left him homeless for two years.

His autobiography titled Relapse was released April 29, 2014 through Coventry House Publishing and became a bestseller.

References

External links
Official Discovery bio
Official DVS homepage

1980 births
Living people
American television personalities
Male television personalities
Sea captains